Conrad-Robin Scheibner (born 7 May 1996) is a German sprint canoeist.

He won a medal at the 2019 ICF Canoe Sprint World Championships and was a double World Champion at the 2021 ICF Canoe Sprint World Championships in the C-1 500 m and C-1 1000 m.

References

External links

1996 births
Living people
Canoeists from Berlin
German male canoeists
ICF Canoe Sprint World Championships medalists in Canadian
Canoeists at the 2020 Summer Olympics
Olympic canoeists of Germany